The Zenair Zodiac CH 640 is a Canadian light aircraft that was designed by Chris Heintz and is produced by Zenair in the form of a kit for amateur construction.

Design and development
The CH 640 was developed from the two-seat type certified AMD Alarus, also called the Zenair CH 2000, by increasing the span of the wings and stabilator, to accommodate the larger engine and increase in gross weight.  The design was also influenced by the Zenith CH 601 and the Zenair CH 300. The design goals were to produce a simple four-seat aircraft capable of flying cross country flights with full seats.

The CH 640 is a four-seat, low-wing touring aircraft with tricycle landing gear and a single engine in tractor configuration.

The aircraft is made from 6061-T6 aluminum. Its  span wing is a cantilever structure and is equipped with flaps. The construction time from the factory-supplied standard kit is estimated at 1250 hours to complete and the quick-build kit at 750 hours. In 2011 the kit cost US$28,995, while finishing a completed aircraft was estimated to cost between US$45,000 to $99,000, depending on options, engine and avionics installed. In December 2011 there were 50 completed and flying.

Operational history
In evaluating the CH 640 AeroNews Network said, "It's a tremendously stable little airplane and a fair amount faster than what you might think."

Specifications (CH 640)

References

External links

Homebuilt aircraft
Single-engined tractor aircraft
Low-wing aircraft
Zenair aircraft